Valentin Ivanov may refer to:

 Valentin Ivanov (astronomer) (born 1967), Bulgarian astronomer
 Valentin Ivanov (footballer, born 1934) (1934–2011), Soviet football player and coach
 Valentin Ivanov (footballer, born 1961), Soviet football player and Russian referee
 Valentin Ivanov (footballer, born 2000), Bulgarian footballer
 Valentin Ivanov (wrestler) (born 1966), Bulgarian Olympic wrestler
 Valentin Ivanov, Deputy Minister in Ministry of Economy, Energy and Tourism (Bulgaria)